In mathematics, the rank of an elliptic curve is the rational Mordell–Weil rank of an elliptic curve  defined over the field of rational numbers. Mordell's theorem says the group of rational points on an elliptic curve has a finite basis. This means that for any elliptic curve there is a finite subset of the rational points on the curve, from which all further rational points may be generated. If the number of rational points on a curve is infinite then some point in a finite basis must have infinite order. The number of independent basis points with infinite order is the rank of the curve.

The rank is related to several outstanding problems in number theory, most notably the Birch–Swinnerton-Dyer conjecture. It is widely believed that there is no maximum rank for an elliptic curve, and it has been shown that there exist curves with rank as large as 28, but it is widely believed that such curves are rare. Indeed, Goldfeld and later Katz–Sarnak conjectured that in a suitable asymptotic sense (see below), the rank of elliptic curves should be 1/2 on average. In other words, half of all elliptic curves should have rank 0 (meaning that the infinite part of its Mordell–Weil group is trivial) and the other half should have rank 1; all remaining ranks consist of a total of 0% of all elliptic curves.

Heights

Mordell–Weil's theorem shows  is a finitely generated abelian group, thus  where  is the finite torsion subgroup and r is the rank of the elliptic curve.

In order to obtain a reasonable notion of 'average', one must be able to count elliptic curves  somehow. This requires the introduction of a height function on the set of rational elliptic curves. To define such a function, recall that a rational elliptic curve  can be given in terms of a Weierstrass form, that is, we can write

 

for some integers . Moreover, this model is unique if for any prime number  such that  divides , we have . We can then assume that  are integers that satisfy this property and define a height function on the set of elliptic curves  by

 

It can then be shown that the number of elliptic curves  with bounded height  is finite.

Average rank

We denote by  the Mordell–Weil rank of the elliptic curve . With the height function  in hand, one can then define the "average rank" as a limit, provided that it exists:

 

It is not known whether or not this limit exists. However, by replacing the limit with the limit superior, one can obtain a well-defined quantity. Obtaining estimates for this quantity is therefore obtaining upper bounds for the size of the average rank of elliptic curves (provided that an average exists).

Upper bounds for the average rank

In the past two decades there has been some progress made towards the task of finding upper bounds for the average rank.

This is achieved by computing the average size of the -Selmer and -Selmer groups of elliptic curves  respectively.

Bhargava and Shankar's approach

Bhargava and Shankar's unconditional proof of the boundedness of the average rank of elliptic curves is obtained by using a certain exact sequence involving the Mordell-Weil group of an elliptic curve . Then we have the following exact sequence

 Ш 

In  Binary quartic forms having bounded invariants, and the boundedness of the average rank of elliptic curves, Bhargava and Shankar computed the 2-Selmer rank of elliptic curves on average. They did so by counting binary quartic forms, using a method used by Birch and Swinnerton-Dyer in their original computation of the analytic rank of elliptic curves which led to their famous conjecture.

Largest known ranks
A common conjecture is that there is no bound on the largest possible rank for an elliptic curve. In 2006, Noam Elkies discovered an elliptic curve with a rank of at least 28:
y2 + xy + y = x3 − x2 − x + 

In 2020, Elkies and Zev Klagsbrun discovered a curve with a rank of exactly 20:
y2 + xy + y = x3 − x2 - 
x +

References

Elliptic curves
Analytic number theory